Kina Isis Collins is an American community organizer and activist, whose work has focused on issues of gun violence, criminal justice reform, and universal healthcare. Collins was a candidate in the 2022 U.S. House election for Illinois' 7th congressional district Democratic primary, and was previously a primary candidate for the same seat in the 2020 election.

Early life and education 
Collins was born and raised in the Austin neighborhood on the West Side of Chicago. She was a student in the Chicago Public Schools system, during which time she served as a Summer of Service Learning Ambassador. She attended Carthage College and Louisiana State University, where she studied international political economy and sociology respectively.

Activism and career

Community organizing and non-profit work 
From 2015 to 2017, Collins worked as a regional organizer from Louisiana for Generation Progress, a youth-centered research and advocacy group formed under the Center for American Progress. During 2016–17, she was selected as a member of Generation Progress' #Fight4AFuture National Leadership Council, which developed campaigns on gun violence prevention and criminal justice reform.

In 2017, she founded an organization called the Chicago Neighborhood Alliance, with the goal of empowering activists to end gun violence in Chicago through civic engagement. From 2018 to 2019, she worked as a national organizer for Physicians for a National Health Program. As of 2020, she serves as the Executive Director of the Gun Violence Prevention Education Center and Illinois Council Against Handgun Violence, a statewide organization focused on gun violence prevention.

Electoral politics and government 
Collins was a staff member in J. B. Pritzker's campaign for governor of Illinois in 2018, but resigned after recordings of conversations between Pritzker and Rod Blagojevich in 2009 where Pritzker made racially insensitive remarks were publicly released. Later in that election cycle, she served as the political director for Sameena Mustafa's unsuccessful campaign for Illinois' 5th congressional district.

In 2018, Collins co-authored the Illinois Council on Women and Girls Act, which created a council to advise the governor and state lawmakers on issues concerning women and girls. She served as the Council's inaugural chairwoman. During her tenure as the Council's chair, Collins was also selected by Chicago City Clerk Anna Valencia to serve on the Status of Women and Girls in Chicago working group.

During the 2019 Chicago aldermanic election, Collins helped form a coalition of organizations called Brand New Council, which aimed to elect progressive candidates of color to Chicago City Council. The coalition endorsed 16 candidates and worked to register new voters.

Recognition 
She received the Vernita Grey Community Activist Award from the Chicago chapter of the National Organization for Women in 2018.

Candidacy for Congress

2020 election 

Collins announced her candidacy for U.S. Representative from Illinois' 7th congressional district on May 13, 2019. She challenged incumbent congressman Danny K. Davis in the Democratic Party primary election for the seat in March 2020, in addition to two other challengers, Anthony Clark and Kristine Schanbacher. Collins highlighted single-payer healthcare, research and resources for gun violence prevention, and criminal justice reform as her three top priorities if elected. She received endorsements from several local officials, including Chicago alderman Jeanette Taylor, Illinois House Representative Anna Moeller, two Oak Park village trustees, two River Forest village trustees, and two local school board members. She was also endorsed by several organizations including the Center for Popular Democracy, Women's March Illinois, and Northside Democracy for America. In the March 17, 2020 Democratic primary election, she placed second with 13.8% of the vote.

2022 election 
Collins announced her candidacy for Illinois's 7th congressional district in 2022 on June 1, 2021. Along with the launch of her campaign, she announced an endorsement from Justice Democrats. Collins outraised incumbent Representative Danny Davis in both of the first two quarters of her campaign. In the June 28, 2022 Democratic primary election, she placed second with 45% of the vote.

Electoral history

References

External links 

 Campaign website

1991 births
21st-century African-American people
21st-century African-American women
Activists from Illinois
African-American women in politics
Candidates in the 2022 United States House of Representatives elections
Carthage College alumni
Illinois Democrats
Living people
Louisiana State University alumni
Women in Illinois politics